Lamar is a small, unincorporated community and census-designated place (CDP) in Aransas County, Texas, United States,  north of Rockport and  north of Corpus Christi. As of the 2010 census it had a population of 636. The community was named for Mirabeau B. Lamar, the second president of the Republic of Texas. This was a new CDP for the 2010 census.

Lamar was founded in 1839 at Lookout Point, on the channel entrance to Copano Bay. President Lamar agreed to relocate the custom house here, and the town thrived as a port and the site of a salt works. This prosperity ended abruptly on February 11, 1864, when the town was bombarded and practically obliterated by the Union Navy.

The restored cemetery is a Texas historical landmark. Goose Island State Park is within the CDP.

Geography
Lamar is located at  (28.140340, -96.987818).

References

Handbook of Texas Online

External links
Lamar Texas and Lamar Cemetery
 RockportFulton.com Local Area Guide

Census-designated places in Aransas County, Texas
Unincorporated communities in Texas
Census-designated places in Texas
Unincorporated communities in Aransas County, Texas